The 2006 New Hampshire gubernatorial election took place on November 7, 2006. Incumbent Democrat John Lynch defeated Republican James B. Coburn and won a second term as Governor of New Hampshire.

Democratic primary

Candidates
John Lynch, incumbent Governor of New Hampshire

Results

Republican primary

Candidates
 Jim Coburn, New Hampshire State Representative

Results

General election

Predictions

Polling

Results

See also
 U.S. gubernatorial elections, 2006

References

External links
Campaign websites (Archived)
 John Lynch
 Jim Coburn

2006
New Hampshire
Gubernatorial